The 1956–57 Irish Cup was the 77th edition of the premier knock-out cup competition in Northern Irish football. 

Glenavon won the cup for the 1st time, defeating Derry City 2–0 in the final at Windsor Park. 

Distillery were the holders but they were defeated 1-0 by Glenavon in the semi-finals.

Results

First round

|}

Replay

|}

Quarter-finals

|}

Replay

|}

Semi-finals

|}

Replay

|}

Final

References

External links
The Rec.Sport.Soccer Statistics Foundation - Northern Ireland - Cup Finals

Irish Cup seasons
1956–57 in Northern Ireland association football
1956–57 domestic association football cups